Forks of Coal is an unincorporated community in Kanawha County, West Virginia, United States. It is part of the Alum Creek census-designated place.

References 

Unincorporated communities in West Virginia
Unincorporated communities in Kanawha County, West Virginia